Africasia may refer to:
 Africasia (mite), a genus of mites in the family Athienemanniidae
 Africasia, a genus of flies in the family Sarcophagidae, synonym of Africasiomyia
 Africasia, a French journal, later name